Uroplatinae is a subfamily of geckos in the family Gekkonidae. At least 28 genera have been found to be cluster in a clade together. In the past this was once a monotypic subfamily that included Uroplatus.

Below are the following genera:

References

Geckos
Reptile subfamilies